Amity, Illinois may refer to:

 Amity, a town plat that became part of Cornell, Illinois
 Pocohontas, Illinois, formerly named Amity